Kaľamenová is a village and municipality in Turčianske Teplice District in the Žilina Region of northern central Slovakia.

History
In historical records the village was first mentioned in 1240.

Geography
The municipality lies at an altitude of 472 metres and covers an area of 5.795 km². It has a population of about 69 people.

Genealogical resources

The records for genealogical research are available at the state archive "Statny Archiv in Bytca, Slovakia"

 Roman Catholic church records (births/marriages/deaths): 1730-1897 (parish B)
 Lutheran church records (births/marriages/deaths): 1784-1896 (parish B)

See also
 List of municipalities and towns in Slovakia

External links
https://web.archive.org/web/20080111223415/http://www.statistics.sk/mosmis/eng/run.html
Surnames of living people in Kalamenova

Villages and municipalities in Turčianske Teplice District